Mitch Valize (born 7 June 1995) is a Dutch Para-cyclist who represented the Netherlands at the 2020 Summer Paralympics.

Career
Valize represented the Netherlands in the men's road time trial H5 event at the 2020 Summer Paralympics and won a gold medal. He also won a gold medal in the men's road race H5 event.

References

Living people
1995 births
Dutch male cyclists
Sportspeople from Heerlen
Cyclists at the 2020 Summer Paralympics
Medalists at the 2020 Summer Paralympics
Paralympic medalists in cycling
Paralympic gold medalists for the Netherlands
20th-century Dutch people
21st-century Dutch people
Cyclists from Limburg (Netherlands)